Charles Périn (1815–1905) was a Belgian economist.

1815 births
1905 deaths
Catholic University of Leuven (1834–1968) alumni
Belgian economists
People from Mons